Lily Attey Daff (born England 1885, died Wellington 1945) was a British-born designer and artist who worked in New Zealand and published watercolour paintings and line drawings of many native New Zealand birds and flowers.

Biography

Lily Daff was born in Upton, London, on 16 March 1885. She took courses in drawing and painting at the London Polytechnic but was also known to have completed at least one course at King Edward Technical College in Dunedin. After her polytechnic training, Daff worked as an illustrator for Christmas card producer Raphael Tuck & Sons. Having left London on the Esperance Bay, Daff arrived in Wellington in 1926 and obtained work with the Government Publicity Department.

In June 1932, Daff, who had served on the staff of the Otago Museum for a year, left Dunedin for Wellington to fulfill a commission for the New Zealand Bird Protection Society to paint a series of pictures of New Zealand native birds. In 1933 she was offered and accepted a position on the Otago Museum staff, "and began what she later described as the happiest period of her life". She took on the role of Officer in Charge of Exhibitions at Otago Museum, painting dioramas, reorganising and decorating the galleries, designing displays, posters, and producing guide-books. Daff served on staff at the museum for 12 years in total. Her obituary claims her chief contribution to scientific education was in the travelling cases which circulated throughout the museums of New Zealand, however now she is mostly known for her illustrations of New Zealand birds. Daff's line illustrations were considered by the Otago Daily Times to turn the newly published guide Introducing the Otago Museum into a "minor collector's item".

Daff illustrated Walter Oliver's book New Zealand Birds and Pérrine Moncrieff's New Zealand Birds and How to Identify Them. Her copies of drawings by J W Barnicoat are in the Hocken Collections, as are a painting of a takahe and other unfinished natural history studies. Daff also supplied hundreds of line drawings to illustrate research publications on ethnography, many of which can be seen online in the Journal of the Polynesian Society. Daff's paintings completed for the New Zealand Bird Protection Society have been published in books and as journal covers many times, and the original paintings are now in the Alexander Turnbull Library.

Lily Attey Daff died on 3 May 1945. Her middle name, commonly spelled Atty, shows as Attey on her birth certificate.

Selected publications

References

Further reading 
 
 
 

1885 births
1945 deaths
20th-century English women artists
20th-century New Zealand women artists
Artists from London
British emigrants to New Zealand
British women illustrators
New Zealand bird artists
New Zealand designers
New Zealand watercolourists
New Zealand women illustrators
People associated with Otago Museum
People from West Ham
Women watercolorists